Peto may refer to:

People
Peto (surname), includes a list of people with the surname Peto
Kawu Peto Dukku (1958–2010), Nigerian politician, Senator for the Gombe North constituency of Gombe State, Nigeria

Other uses
PETO, a German party
Peto (food), a Colombian dessert
USS Peto (SS-265), a US submarine
Parnall Peto, a British seaplane
Peto baronets, two baronetcies created for members of the Peto family, both in the Baronetage of the United Kingdom
Peto, Yucatán, a town 
Peto Municipality in Yucatán state, Mexico
A minor character who appears in the Henriad plays by Shakespeare as a criminal associate of Falstaff
Grissell and Peto, a civil engineering partnership between Thomas Grissell and his cousin Morton Peto
Peto, Brassey and Betts, a civil engineering partnership between Samuel Morton Peto, Thomas Brassey and Edward Betts
Peto and Betts, a civil engineering partnership formed in 1848 between Morton Peto and Edward Ladd Betts

See also

Peeto, genus of spiders